VPE may refer to:

Visionaries Pursuing Excellence
IATA airport code for Ondjiva Pereira Airport
Verb phrase ellipsis
Vero Precision Engineering Ltd
Vice president of engineering, a job title
Video Processing Engine
Vinnie Potestivo Entertainment
United Pentecostal and Evangelical Churches (Dutch: Verenigde Pinkster- en Evangeliegemeenten)
Vape